O2 is a 2022 Indian Tamil-language survival film written and directed by G. S. Viknesh and produced by Dream Warrior Pictures, starring Nayanthara and Rithvik.

Plot
Trapped in a landslide,  Parvathy has to survive in a no ventilation zone and keep the oxygen flowing into her son Veera's body. What happens when she gets obstructed by fellow passengers?

Cast

Production

Development

Casting 
Rithvik, who is popular under his sketch-comedy YouTube channel Rithu Rocks, was selected to play Nayanthara's son Veera.

Music 
The music is composed by Vishal Chandrasekar with lyrics written by Rajesh Giriprasad and Mohan Rajan. The first single "Swasamae", sung by Brindha Sivakumar, was released on 26 May 2022. The second single "Vaanam Yaavum", sung by Pradeep Kumar, was released on 14 June 2022.

Release 
The film was digitally released on 17 June 2022 through Disney+ Hotstar.

Reception 
O2 was described as a "pretty engaging survival drama which distinguishes between brute force and real heroism". Manoj Kumar from The Indian Express gave 3 out of 5, stating that "Nayanthara pulls off a splendid performance in this largely engaging thriller". Priyanka Thirumurthy from The News Minute gave 3.5 out of 5 and wrote "it is actor Nayanthara who shoulders this weight splendidly and credit must be given to the director GS Viknesh for writing a role where a woman can be unapologetically selfish, self-serving and downright violent to protect her own. Nayanthara skilfully shoulders O2". Logesh Balachandran from The Times of India rated the film 3 out of 5 and wrote "Debutant director GS Viknesh's O2 may not be an edge-of-the-seat thriller, but its powerful enough to keep you hooked throughout with distinct characters". The reviewer concluded that it was "An engaging survival thriller". India glitz rated the movie 3 out of 5, stating that "Nayanthara's film O2 is a decent survival thriller uplifted by good performances". Haricharan Pudipeddi from Hindustan Times wrote "Nayanthara's film is a race against time survival thriller set inside a bus", and described the Nayanthara -Rithvik chemistry as a highlight. Latha Srinivasan from Moneycontrol praised the film's concept while criticising its execution. However, the critic said "It's the performance of Nayanthara and Rithvik that keep you engaged". Ashameera Aiyappan of Firstpost rated the film 2 out of 5 stars and wrote "O2 falls flat despite convincing performances from Nayanthara and Ritwik".
 
However,Bhavana Sharma  criric from Pinkvilla stated that "Films on natural disasters were made earlier too but nothing seems as improper as O2. The director should have reworked the story to make it better." and gave 1.5 rating out of 5..India Today critic wrote " Director GS Viknesh’s O2, starring Nayanthara and Baby Rithvik, tries to be an intelligent survival drama. But, the film ends up being a joke with its so-called twists and turns".Sibby Jayya critic from India Herald noted that "In tamil cinema, the survival thriller is not a well-established subgenre. If a few flaws can be overlooked, fans of the genre will probably appreciate O2."The Quint critic gave 2.5 rating out of 5 gave mixture of reviews. Gautaman Bhaskaran critic from News 18 gave moxture of reviews and gave 1.5 star out of 5.

References

External links 
 

2022 films
Indian survival films
2020s survival films